Valençay is a cheese made in the province of Berry in central France. Its name is derived from the town of Valençay in the Indre department.

Its rustic blue-grey colour is made by the natural moulds that form its rind, darkened with a dusting of charcoal. The young cheese has a fresh, citric taste, with age giving it a nutty taste characteristic of goat cheeses.

The cheese achieved AOC status in 1998 making Valençay the first region to achieve AOC status for both its cheese and its wine.

History
The province Berry has been the home to many cheeses for centuries, and has produced Selles-sur-Cher, Crottin de Chavignol and Pouligny-Saint-Pierre among others.

One apocryphal tale has it that Napoleon having returned from his disastrous campaigns in Egypt stopped at the castle at Valençay. Their local pyramidal cheese apparently aroused unpleasant memories as he alleged then cut the top off in fury with his sword leaving the shape that survives to the present.

Manufacture

The curd is drained and placed in a mould. After being removed it is covered with charcoal dust and left to ripen in a humid, ventilated room. Ripening lasts for three weeks during which time the characteristic external mould forms and the central pate - initially crumbly - softens.

The cheese is available between March and December, with peak manufacture between April and August.

See also
 List of goat milk cheeses

References

External links 
 Extraits de terroir, destinés au partage...

French cheeses
French products with protected designation of origin
Goat's-milk cheeses
Berry, France